The State Anthem of the Ukrainian SSR was the Soviet republican anthem of the Ukrainian Soviet Socialist Republic when it was one of the republics of the Soviet Union.

It has been banned in Ukraine since 2015 due to decommunization laws.

Background
The Ukrainian People's Republic had instituted "Shche ne vmerla Ukrainy i slava, i volia" as its anthem in 1917. It was banned when the Russian and Ukrainian Bolsheviks took control Ukraine in 1920 and created the USSR in 1922. But they did not see any need for a Ukrainian anthem until the 1940s.

The idea of creating the anthem arose in context with introduction of the Ukrainian SSR to the United Nations organization, the creation of which was discussed at the 1943 Teheran Conference. In order to receive extra votes in the United Nations, Stalin came up with the idea to add two union republics – Ukraine and Belarus – which had to be portrayed as fully sovereign republics. In relation to that about a month later on 28 January – 1 February 1944 in Moscow was convened the 10th session of the Supreme Soviet of the Soviet Union which adapted laws about creation of key people's commissariats (ministries) in union republics such as defense and foreign affairs. Already on 3 February 1944 the Presidium of the Supreme Soviet issued its Ukase "About state anthems of Soviet republics", according to which all union republics were obligated to adopt own anthems.

In spring of 1944 in Kiev was established a commission in preparation of anthem draft, which was headed by director of the Agitation and Propaganda section of the Central Committee of the Communist Party (b) of Ukraine Konstantin Litvin. The Ukrainian poets who participated in contest were given quite responsible and "delicate" task to create such "main song of Ukraine" that in all and completely would "fit" into the politically ideological context of the All-Union anthem ("State Anthem of the Soviet Union") and at the same time reflect the Ukrainian national characteristics.

The leitmotif or motto-theme of practically all variants of the Ukrainian anthem lyrics submitted at the contest became glorification of the "older brother – the Great Russian people" and the "Vozhd of all nations Joseph Stalin". Among such variants were examples that began with the following leading lines:
 "In fraternal unity of Slavic nations our first brother is the people of Russia"
 "Russia is our freedom and glory that united our nation and our land bloomed"
 "Be glorious in the heart of Ukraine, the great friend, our Russian brother"

The authors were offering to implement into the anthem lines that would call Ukrainians "to live under the sun of the Kremlin and Moscow", "follow the freedom road under the stars of friendship, the stars of Moscow", to glorify "in the heart of Ukraine, the great friend, our Russian brother" and so on. In regards to Joseph Stalin, the creative fantasy of anthem writers had no limits indeed. The Vozhd was named as the Sun, the Dawn, the Father of Ukraine (e.g. "Two suns you have one in the Kremlin, another burns in the blue sky"). There were numerous versions that were submitted, but never adopted during the still ongoing war. Finally in 1949 due to certain awkwardness in the United Nations, there arose the issue to make changes to the Ukrainian state symbols, so there was finally adopted the new State Emblem and State Flag of the Ukrainian SSR.

The authors of lyrics of the State Anthem of the Ukrainian SSR became prominent Soviet Ukrainian poets Pavlo Tychyna and Mykola Bazhan, while the music was written by a creative team led by Soviet composer Anton Lebedynets. The text body of the "main Ukrainian patriotic song", completely "fitted" into the ideological context of the All-Union anthem by glorifying the Soviet Union, in which the united Ukraine "found its happiness", "as a flower has blossomed", the Russian people who "in struggle for the fate of our nation was always our friend and brother", as well as the vozhdes like Lenin who "illuminated us the path to freedom" and Stalin who "leads us to the illustrious heights".

When Stalin died in 1953, during the De-Stalinization, the State Anthems were muted by Nikita Khrushchev along with the Ukrainian SSR. In 1977, the Soviet Union adopted a new constitution and lyrics of the National Anthem, all its Socialist Republics followed the same path.

The fact that in the Soviet Ukrainian anthem the manifestation of national patriotic sentiments was transmitted through demonstration of loyalty to another nation undoubtedly could be considered the most fascinating paradox of the Soviet Ukrainian authorship of anthem. However that paradox was completely natural as the anthem of the UkrSSR was a real visiting card of the Ukrainian Soviet puppet statehood. Such it remained and after the implemented respective corrections in it in 1958 following the All-Union parenting model.

The music was composed by Anton Dmytrovych Lebedynets, and the words were written by Pavlo Tychyna. In 1958, the second stanza of the lyrics was changed by Mykola Bazhan to remove mentions of Joseph Stalin; the new third stanza omitted reference to the “people’s sword of righteous anger” and added a new reference to “Lenin’s party” (the Communist Party of the Soviet Union) while retaining the one to Communism itself. The anthem of the USSR was also played during nearly all official events in Ukraine.

On 15 January 1992, the Presidium of Verkhovna Rada issue its ukase stating that the Anthem of the Ukrainian Soviet Socialist Republic loses its status and starting with 16 January 1992 it is replaced with the earlier anthem "Shche ne vmerla Ukrainy i slava, i volia".

In 2002 there was an attempt to reintroduce the Ukrainian Soviet anthem with a changed text edited by Mykhailo Tush. Previously, the Soviet anthems were already revived in the Russian Federation and Belarus. Another attempt took place in 2010, in which the Luhansk wing of the Communist Party of Ukraine held a competition for new lyrics, which was won by Igor Ortsev from Luhansk.

Since 2015, performance of this song is prohibited in Ukraine and offenders may be subject to up to five years of imprisonment for "Propaganda of the Soviet totalitarian symbols".

Lyrics

1949–1956 Version

1956–1992 Version

Lyrics proposed in 2010
The following are the lyrics by Igor Ortsev chosen in the competition held by the Luhansk wing of the Communist Party of Ukraine in 2010.

See also
 Ukrainian anthem

Notes

References

External links
 Ukase of the Presidium № 3178-IX. About the State Anthem of the Ukrainian SSR (Про Державний гімн Української РСР). Verkhovna Rada of the Ukrainian SSR. 22 March 1978.
 Ukase of the Presidium № 2042-XII. About the State Anthem of Ukraine (Про Державний гімн України). Verkhovna Rada of Ukraine. 15 January 1992.
 Why Soviet Ukraine was only a façade of the Soviet Russian occupation of Ukraine (Чому радянська Україна була лише фасадом російсько-радянської окупації України). The Ukrainian Week. 13 December 2012.
 Instrumental recording in MP3 format (Full version)
 Instrumental recording in MP3 format (Short version)
 MIDI-like mp3 file
 Vocal recording in MP3 format
 Lyrics, nationalanthems.info
 (1949 version)

Ukrainian SSR
Ukrainian music
Ukrainian Soviet Socialist Republic
Propaganda in the Soviet Union
Communist Party of Ukraine (Soviet Union)
1949 establishments in the Soviet Union
1992 disestablishments in Ukraine